David Mirvish,  (born August 29, 1944) is a Canadian art collector, art dealer, theatre producer, real estate developer and son of the late Toronto discount department store owner "Honest" Ed Mirvish and artist Anne Lazar Macklin.

Life and career
Mirvish was born in Toronto, Ontario. He owns and operates the Royal Alexandra Theatre, the Princess of Wales Theatre, the Ed Mirvish Theatre and the Panasonic Theatre, all in Toronto. From 2002 to 2005, he was on the Board of Trustees of the Royal Ontario Museum. He was also a member of the Board of Trustees of the National Gallery of Canada.

From 1963 through 1975, Mirvish operated a contemporary art gallery—the David Mirvish Gallery—specialising in the American abstract painters of the 1960s and 1970s known as the Color Field school.

He closed the gallery in 1975, but continues to buy and sell privately and to lend works to museums for exhibition.

Mirvish Productions

Canadian theatre
In 1987, he took over direction of his father's 1497-seat Toronto theatre, the Royal Alexandra Theatre. For most of the theatre's history, it had functioned as a road house—a temporary venue for touring productions. In 1987, Mirvish founded the company Mirvish Productions for the purpose of producing and staging original works for the Royal Alexandra and, later, his new Princess of Wales Theatre (opened in 1993).

Mirvish and Mirvish Productions enjoyed notable successes in this new venture as with the Canadian stagings of such musicals as Les Misérables (1989–1990), Miss Saigon (1993–1995), Crazy for You (1994–1995), Rent (1997–1998), The Lion King (2000–2004), We Will Rock You and The Sound of Music (opened October 2008). They also, however, endured losses with their sit-down productions of the large-scale musicals Tommy (1995), Jane Eyre (1996–1997),  The Producers (2003–2004), Hairspray (2004).

In 2005, he also joined in partnership with British theatre producer Kevin Wallace, American film producer Saul Zaentz and Canadian concert promoter Michael Cohl to produce The Lord of the Rings, a stage musical adaptation of J. R. R. Tolkien's fantasy trilogy. This production opened at the Princess of Wales Theatre in March 2006. Because of poor reviews and slow sales the show closed early. On June 28, 2006, Mirvish announced that Sept. 3, 2006 would mark the show's closing, and that he would be unable to fully repay its investors. With an estimated capitalisation of $28 million, The Lord of the Rings had been advertised as the most expensive stage production in North American history.

The Old Vic

Mirvish also operated the London, England, theatre the Old Vic (purchased and renovated by his father in 1982) from 1987 through 1998. In 1987, he installed Jonathan Miller as artistic director of The Old Vic and enjoyed a string of outstanding critical successes—including an Olivier Award for a production of the musical Candide, but, unfortunately, three straight years of financial loss. In 1990,  Mirvish terminated  Miller's contract over budget issues, earning much negative criticism in the British press.

In 1997, Mirvish appointed Sir Peter Hall as artistic director of the Old Vic and, again, enjoyed critical acclaim with such productions as The Master Builder with Alan Bates and Waiting for Godot with Ben Kingsley, but continuing financial loss. Within a year of the appointment, Mirvish terminated Hall's contract—again to much negative comment in the press—and put the Old Vic up for sale. The theatre was subsequently (1998) purchased by a theatres trust, The Old Vic Theatre Trust.

Real estate
In 2000, Mirvish began a new business venture as a real estate developer and began construction of a large condominium complex in downtown Toronto, known as One King West. The building opened for occupancy in 2005.

In March 2008 Mirvish announced the acquisition of the Panasonic and Canon Theatres in Toronto from Key Brand Entertainment, which had itself purchased the theatres from Live Nation in February 2008.  Mirvish had been operating the Canon Theatre under a 15-year lease signed in 2001 with Live Nation which gave him control over all bookings and management of the Canon. Mirvish acquired the theatre pursuant to a right of first offer contained in the same lease agreement. The purchase and sale triggered a lawsuit from rival Canadian presenter, Aubrey Dan, who had invested in Key Brand on the alleged promise that he would become manager of the Canon theatre. Dan sued both Mirvish and his own company, Key Brand, in an action which is still pending as of December 2008. The Canon was renamed The Ed Mirvish Theatre in honour of David Mirvish's late father on December 6, 2011.

In August 2010, Mirvish announced that he would provide a 9,765 square foot space to Theatre Museum Canada, thus providing the largely online museum with its first permanent space for exhibition.

On October 1, 2012, David Mirvish announced a partnership with renowned architect Frank Gehry to redevelop his family's considerable real estate holdings on King Street West in Toronto. The proposed project includes three distinct tall buildings, called by Mirvish as "sculptures that people would live in," and a pedestal that would also house a new gallery devoted to Mirvish's extensive collection of abstract expressionist art and a new campus for the OCAD University. Should the project receive municipal zoning approval, it would be that the buildings currently on the site (four low-rise industrial and warehouse buildings and the Princess of Wales Theatre) would be demolished. The estimated time until completion is 10 years.

Honours and awards
Mirvish was made a member of the Order of Canada in 1995, and in 2001, the Order of Ontario. In 2004, he received an honorary degree from the University of Toronto.

On February 13, 2012, David Mirvish was named Chancellor of the University of Guelph.

References

External links
Official site Mirvish Productions

1945 births
Businesspeople from Toronto
Canadian art collectors
Canadian art dealers
Canadian art curators
Canadian theatre managers and producers
Canadian people of American-Jewish descent
Canadian people of Austrian-Jewish descent
Canadian people of Lithuanian-Jewish descent
Chancellors of the University of Guelph
Fellows of the Royal Conservatory of Music
Living people
Members of the Order of Canada
Members of the Order of Ontario
Laurence Olivier Award winners
David
Royal Ontario Museum